Reunited Worlds is a South Korean television series starring Yeo Jin-goo, Ahn Jae-hyun, and Lee Yeon-hee. It aired on SBS from July 19 to September 21, 2017, for 40 episodes.

Synopsis 
Sung Hae-sung (Yeo Jin-goo) is a senior high school student. On Hae-sung's birthday, his girlfriend Jung Jung-won (Jung Chae-yeon) prepares a surprise party for him at his house. To keep Hae-sung away from the house while they prepare, Jung-won asks him to go to their school and retrieve her wallet. There, he walks into a shocking scene. While trying to get help, he is hit by a car and dies. 12 years later, Hae-sung wakes up at the roof of his school building, and he meets Jung-won (Lee Yeon-hee) again. Although Jung-won and Hae-sung were born in the same year, the two childhood friends end up being 12 years apart because they have aged at different places (worlds) for some strange reason. Now Jung-won is a 31-year-old woman, but Hae-sung is still a 19-year-old boy. With the assistance of his friends and Jung-won, Hae-sung sets out to make things right for his family and solve the mysteries surrounding his death and resurrection.

Cast

Main
Yeo Jin-goo as Sung Hae-sung (19-years-old)
Lee Yeon-hee as Jung Jung-won (31-years-old)
Jung Chae-yeon as young Jung-won
Ahn Jae-hyun as Cha Min-joon (34-years-old)

Recurring

Hae-sung and Jung-won's friends

 Shin Soo-ho as Kil Moon-shik (31-years-old)
 Kim Min-sang as young Kil Moon-shik
Electronic Service Center employee.
 Lee Si-eon as Shin Ho-bang (31-years-old)
 Park Sung-joon as young Shin Ho-bang
Police officer.
 Kim Jin-woo as Cha Tae-hoon (31-years-old)
  as young Cha Tae-hoon
The chief executive of a department store. Cha Min-joon's younger half-brother.
 Park Jin-joo as Hong Jin-joo (31-years-old)
 Park Jin-soo as young Hong Jin-joo
Roaming yoga instructor.

Hae-sung's siblings

 Yoon Sun-woo as Sung Young-joon (30-years-old)
  as young Sung Young-joon
Chest surgeon. Sung Hae-sung's younger step-brother.
 Kim Ga-eun as Sung Young-in (26-years-old)
  as young Sung Young-in
Employee in a clothing department store. Sung Hae-sung's younger step-sister.
 Kwak Dong-yeon as Sung Hae-chul (25-years-old)
 Jeon Jin-seo as younger Sung Hae-chul
Sung Gong-joo's father. Sung Hae-sung's real younger brother
 Kim Hye-jun as Sung Soo-ji (19-years-old)
  as young Sung Soo-ji
High school senior. Sung Hae-sung's younger half-sister.

Hae-sung's family

 Kim Han-na as Sung Gong-joo (6-years-old)
Sung Hae-sung's niece. Sung Hae-chul's daughter.
 Park Seung-tae as Kang Mal-yi (78-years-old)
Sung Hae-sung's grandmother.

Extended

 Park Yeong-gyu as Cha Kwon-pyo (65-years-old)
Cha Min-joon and Cha Tae-hoon's father. Cheongho High School Chairman.
 Bang Eun-hee as Yoon Mi-na (55-years-old)
Cha Tae-hoon's mother. Cha Kwon Pyo's second wife.
 Han So-hee as Lee Seo-won (27-years-old)
Sung Young-joon's girlfriend. Hospital Director's daughter. Fashion journalist.
 Kyeon Mi-ri as Son Myung-ok (55-years-old)
Lee Seo-won's mother. 
 Kim Byung-se as Lee Gun-chul (58-years-old)
Lee Seo-won's father. Hospital director.
 Ahn Gil-kang as Ahn Tae-bok
 Lee Je-yeon as Yang Kyung-chul

 Kim Hee-jung as Nam Yoo-min
Sung Gong-joo's biological mother
 Min Joon-ho as Sous-chef (30-years-old)
 Choi Sung-min as Dong-hyun
 Ahn Sol-bin as Nam Soon-ji
 Kim Young-woong as Moneylender
 Bae Jin-woong as Moneylender
 Jung Wook
 Kim Dong-kyoon
 Baek Ji-won as Landlord
 Han Eun-seon
 Oh Jung-tae as Accessory salesman
 Park Hyun-sook as Cha Min-joon's maternal aunt
 Kang Sung-min as Park Dong-seok / Jason Park

Special appearances
 Seo Yi-sook as Jung Jung-won's mother
 Yoon Mi-ra as Lady Doh
 Jeon Gook-hwan as Ha Do-kwon

Production 
The series is the third collaboration between writer Lee Hee-myung and PD Baek Soo-chan, who worked on The Girl Who Sees Smells (2015) and Beautiful Gong Shim (2016).

Original soundtrack

Part 1

Ratings 
 In the table above,  represent the lowest ratings and  represent the highest ratings.
NR denotes that the drama did not rank in the top 20 daily programs on that date

References

External links 
  

 

Seoul Broadcasting System television dramas
South Korean romantic fantasy television series
2017 South Korean television series debuts
Korean-language television shows
2017 South Korean television series endings
Television series set in 2005
Television series about teenagers